The first impeachment trial of Donald Trump, the 45th president of the United States, began on December 18, 2019, during the 116th United States Congress. The House of Representatives adopted two articles of impeachment against Trump: abuse of power and obstruction of Congress. Trump was acquitted by the Senate on February 5, 2020.

Trump's impeachment came after a formal House inquiry found that he had solicited foreign interference in the 2020 U.S. presidential election to help his re-election bid and then obstructed the inquiry itself by telling his administration officials to ignore subpoenas for documents and testimony. The inquiry reported that Trump withheld military aid and an invitation to the White House to Ukrainian president Volodymyr Zelenskyy in order to influence Ukraine to announce an investigation into Trump's political opponent Joe Biden and to promote a discredited conspiracy theory that Ukraine, not Russia, was behind interference in the 2016 presidential election. A phone call between Trump and Zelenskyy on July 25, 2019 was particularly important according to Congressional testimony from Lt. Col. Alexander Vindman, a member of the National Security Council who listened to the call from the White House Situation Room.

The inquiry stage of Trump's impeachment lasted from September to November 2019 in the wake of Vindman's August whistleblower complaint alleging Trump's abuse of power. In October, three congressional committees (Intelligence, Oversight, and Foreign Affairs) deposed witnesses. In November, the House Intelligence Committee held a number of public hearings in which witnesses testified publicly; on December 3, the committee voted 13–9 along party lines to adopt a final report. The total number of witnesses testifying either publicly or in closed door sessions was 17. A set of impeachment hearings before the House Judiciary Committee began on December 4; on December 13, it voted 23–17 along party lines to recommend two articles of impeachment for abuse of power and obstruction of Congress. The committee released a lengthy report on the impeachment articles on December 16. Two days later, the full House approved both articles in a mostly party-line vote, with all Republicans opposing, along with three Democrats. This made Trump the third U.S. president in history to be impeached and marked the first fully partisan impeachment where a U.S. president was impeached without support for the impeachment from the President's own party.

The articles were submitted to the Senate on January 16, 2020, initiating the trial. The trial saw no witnesses or documents being subpoenaed, as Republican senators rejected attempts to introduce subpoenas. On February 5, Trump was acquitted on both counts by the Senate, as neither count received 67 votes to convict. On Article I, abuse of power, the vote was 48 for conviction, 52 for acquittal. On Article II, obstruction of Congress, the vote was 47 for conviction, 53 for acquittal. Republican Mitt Romney, the only senator to break party lines, became the first U.S. senator to vote to convict a president of his own party in an impeachment trial, as he voted for conviction on abuse of power. Trump remained in office for the remainder of his term.

Two days after the acquittal, Trump fired two witnesses who had testified about his conduct in the impeachment inquiry: Ambassador Gordon Sondland and Alexander Vindman, together with Vindman's twin brother Yevgeny.

Background 

Donald Trump is the third U.S. president to be impeached by the House of Representatives, after Andrew Johnson in 1868 and Bill Clinton in 1998. Before Trump, Johnson was the only president to be impeached in his first term. The House Judiciary Committee also voted to adopt three articles of impeachment against Richard Nixon, but he resigned prior to the full House vote. The Senate voted to acquit both Johnson and Clinton in their trials.

Congress's first efforts to impeach Trump were initiated by Democratic representatives Al Green and Brad Sherman in 2017. In December 2017, an impeachment resolution failed in the House with a 58–364 vote margin. Following the 2018 elections, the Democrats gained a majority in the House and launched multiple investigations into Trump's actions and finances. Speaker of the House Nancy Pelosi initially resisted calls for impeachment. In May 2019, however, she indicated that Trump's continued actions, which she characterized as obstruction of justice and refusal to honor Congressional subpoenas, might make an impeachment inquiry necessary.

Investigations into various scandals in the Trump administration, which could lead to articles of impeachment, were initiated by various house congressional committees led by Pelosi and began in February 2019. A formal impeachment investigation began in July 2019, and several subpoenas were issued; while most were honored, several were not. The Trump administration asserted executive privilege, which led to several lawsuits, including In re: Don McGahn.

Trump–Ukraine scandal

The Trump–Ukraine scandal revolves around efforts by U.S. President Donald Trump to coerce Ukraine and other foreign countries into providing damaging narratives about 2020 Democratic Party presidential primary candidate Joe Biden, as well as information relating to the origins of previous political attacks against him, such as the claims investigated by Robert Mueller. Trump enlisted surrogates within and outside his official administration, including his lawyer Rudy Giuliani and Attorney General William Barr, to pressure Ukraine and other foreign governments to cooperate in investigating conspiracy theories concerning American politics. Trump blocked but later released payment of a congressionally mandated $400 million military aid package to allegedly obtain quid pro quo cooperation from Volodymyr Zelenskyy, the president of Ukraine. A number of contacts were established between the White House and the government of Ukraine, culminating in a phone call between Trump and Zelenskyy on July 25, 2019. Less than two hours later, on behalf of the president, senior executive budget official Michael Duffey discreetly instructed the Pentagon to continue withholding military aid to Ukraine.

The scandal reached public attention in mid-September 2019 after a whistleblower complaint made in August 2019. The complaint raised concerns about Trump using presidential powers to solicit foreign electoral intervention in the 2020 U.S. presidential election. The Trump White House has corroborated several allegations raised by the whistleblower. A non-verbatim transcript of the Trump–Zelenskyy call confirmed that Trump requested investigations into Joe Biden and his son Hunter, as well as a discredited conspiracy theory involving a Democratic National Committee server, while repeatedly urging Zelenskyy to work with Giuliani and Barr on these matters. The White House also confirmed that the record of the call had been transferred to a highly classified system. White House acting chief of staff Mick Mulvaney said one reason why Trump withheld military aid to Ukraine was Ukrainian "corruption related to the DNC server", referring to a debunked theory that Ukrainians framed Russia for hacking into the DNC computer system. After the impeachment inquiry began, Trump publicly urged Ukraine and China to investigate the Bidens. Bill Taylor, the Trump administration's top diplomat to Ukraine, testified that he was told that U.S. military aid to Ukraine and a Trump–Zelenskyy White House meeting were conditioned on Zelenskyy publicly announcing investigations into the Bidens and alleged Ukrainian interference in the 2016 U.S. elections. United States Ambassador to the European Union Gordon Sondland testified that he worked with Giuliani at Trump's "express direction" to arrange a quid pro quo with the Ukraine government.

Inquiry 

On the evening of September 24, 2019, Pelosi announced that six committees of the House of Representatives would begin a formal impeachment inquiry into President Trump. Pelosi accused the President of betraying his oath of office, national security, and the integrity of the country's elections. The six committees charged with the task were those on Financial Services, the Judiciary, Intelligence, Foreign Affairs, Oversight and Reform, and Ways and Means.

In October 2019, three congressional committees (Intelligence, Oversight, and Foreign Affairs) deposed witnesses, including Ambassador Taylor, Laura Cooper (the deputy assistant secretary of defense for Russian, Ukrainian and Eurasian affairs), and former White House official Fiona Hill. Witnesses testified that they believed that President Trump wanted Zelenskyy to publicly announce investigations into the Bidens and Burisma (a Ukrainian natural gas company on whose board Hunter Biden had served) and 2016 election interference. On October 8, in a letter from White House counsel Pat Cipollone to House speaker Pelosi, the White House officially responded that it would not cooperate with the investigation due to concerns including that there had not yet been a vote of the full House and that interviews of witnesses were being conducted behind closed doors. On October 17, Mulvaney said in response to a reporter's allegation of quid pro quo, "We do that all the time with foreign policy. Get over it." He walked back his comments later that day, asserting there had been "absolutely no quid pro quo" and that Trump had withheld military aid to Ukraine over concerns of the country's corruption.

On October 29, 2019, Massachusetts representative Jim McGovern introduced a resolution referred to House Rules Committee, which set forth the "format of open hearings in the House Intelligence Committee, including staff-led questioning of witnesses, and [authorization for] the public release of deposition transcripts". This resolution, formally authorizing the impeachment inquiry, was approved by the House by a vote of 232 to 196 on October 31, 2019. In November 2019, the House Intelligence Committee held a number of public hearings in which witnesses testified publicly. On November 13, Taylor and Kent testified publicly. Ambassador Marie Yovanovitch testified before the committee on November 15, 2019. Lieutenant Colonel Alexander Vindman, the National Security Council's head of European affairs, and Jennifer Williams, Vice President Mike Pence's chief European security adviser, testified together on the morning of November 19, 2019. Later that day, Kurt Volker, the former U.S. special representative for Ukraine, and Tim Morrison, the former national security presidential adviser on Europe and Russia, gave public testimony before the House Intelligence Committee. Also subpoenaed were Foreign Service Officers Catherine Croft, Jennifer Williams, Christopher Anderson, and Suriya Jayanti.

On November 20, 2019, Ambassador Sondland testified that he conducted his work with Giuliani at the "express direction of the president", and that he understood a potential White House invitation for Zelenskyy to be contingent on Ukraine announcing investigations into the 2016 elections and Burisma. Later that day, Cooper and David Hale, the under secretary of state for political affairs, testified jointly before the committee. On November 21, 2019, Fiona Hillwho, until August 2019, was the top Russia expert on the National Security Councilcriticized Republicans for promulgating the "fictional narrative" that Ukraine rather than Russia interfered in the 2016 election, asserting that the theory was planted by Russia and played into its hands. Testifying alongside Hill was David Holmes, the current head of political affairs in the U.S. Embassy in Ukraine.

On December 3, the House Intelligence Committee voted 13–9 along party lines to adopt a final report and also send it to the House Judiciary Committee. The report's preface states:[T]he impeachment inquiry has found that President Trump, personally and acting through agents within and outside of the U.S. government, solicited the interference of a foreign government, Ukraine, to benefit his reelection. In furtherance of this scheme, President Trump conditioned official acts on a public announcement by the new Ukrainian President, Volodymyr Zelenskyy, of politically-motivated investigations, including one into President Trump's domestic political opponent. In pressuring President Zelenskyy to carry out his demand, President Trump withheld a White House meeting desperately sought by the Ukrainian President, and critical U.S. military assistance to fight Russian aggression in eastern Ukraine. The Republicans of the House committees had released a countering report the previous day, saying in part that the evidence does not support accusations. "The evidence presented does not prove any of these Democrat allegations, and none of the Democrats' witnesses testified to having evidence of bribery, extortion, or any high crime or misdemeanor," said the draft report. This report also painted the push to impeachment as solely politically motivated. "The Democrats are trying to impeach a duly elected President based on the accusations and assumptions of unelected bureaucrats who disagreed with President Trump's policy initiatives and processes," the report's executive summary states. During the inquiry, the Trump administration's public arguments were limited to assertions that the president had done nothing wrong and the process was unfair.

Impeachment

Judiciary Committee hearings 

On December 5, Speaker Pelosi authorized the Judiciary Committee to begin drafting articles of impeachment.

A set of impeachment hearings was brought before the Judiciary Committee, with Trump and his lawyers being invited to attend. The administration declined as the president was scheduled to attend a NATO summit in London. In a second letter on December 6, Cipollone again said that the White House would not offer a defense or otherwise participate in the impeachment inquiry, writing to chairman Jerry Nadler, "As you know, your impeachment inquiry is completely baseless and has violated basic principles of due process and fundamental fairness." Nadler responded in a statement, "We gave President Trump a fair opportunity to question witnesses and present his own to address the overwhelming evidence before us. After listening to him complain about the impeachment process, we had hoped that he might accept our invitation."

The first hearing, held on December 4, 2019, was an academic discussion on the definition of an impeachable offense. The witnesses invited by Democrats were law professors Noah Feldman from Harvard, Pamela S. Karlan from Stanford, and Michael Gerhardt from the University of North Carolina. Republicans invited Jonathan Turley, a constitutional scholar at George Washington University; Turley, who had testified in favor of the impeachment of President Bill Clinton in 1999, testified against impeaching Trump, citing a lack of evidence. It was observed that he contradicted his own opinion on impeachment from when Clinton was on trial.

Potential articles of impeachment outlined during the hearing include abuse of power for arranging a quid pro quo with the president of Ukraine, obstruction of Congress for hindering the House's investigation, and obstruction of justice for attempting to dismiss Robert Mueller during his investigation of Russian interference in the 2016 election. On December 5, Pelosi requested that the House Judiciary Committee draft articles of impeachment. After the vote, Pelosi said that, while this was "a great day for the Constitution", it was "a sad day for America". She also said, "I could not be prouder or more inspired by the moral courage of the House Democrats. We never asked one of them how they were going to vote. We never whipped this vote."

Articles of impeachment

On December 10, 2019, Democrats on the House Judiciary Committee announced they would levy two articles of impeachment, designated H. Res. 755: (1) abuse of power, and (2) obstruction of Congress, in its investigation of the President's conduct regarding Ukraine. Draft text of the articles was released later that day, as well as a report by the judiciary committee outlining the constitutional case for impeachment and asserting that "impeachment is part of democratic governance". The committee planned to vote on the articles on December 12, but postponed it to the next day after the 14-hour partisan debate on the final versions of the articles lasted until after 11:00 p.m. EST. On December 13, the Judiciary Committee voted along party lines to pass both articles of impeachment; both articles passed 23–17, with all Democrats present voting in support and all Republicans voting in opposition. Democrat Ted Lieu was ill and not present to vote.

On December 16, the House Judiciary Committee released a 658-page report on the articles of impeachment, specifying criminal bribery and wire fraud charges as part of the abuse of power article. The articles were forwarded to the full House for debate and a vote on whether to impeach the president on December 18.

House vote 
Article I, Section 2, Clause 5 of the U.S. Constitution states that "The House of Representatives... shall have the sole Power of Impeachment."

On December 17, the House Rules Committee held a hearing to write the rules governing the debate over impeachment. The first of three votes was on the rules governing debate: 228 to 197, with all Republicans and two Democrats voting no. This was followed by six hours of debate. One of the highlights of this contentious event was Georgia representative Barry Loudermilk comparing the impeachment inquiry of President Trump to the trial of Jesus Christ, saying that the Christian savior was treated far better by the authorities. Maryland representative Steny Hoyer contributed closing arguments: "All of us feel a sense of loyalty to party ... It's what makes our two-party system function. It's what helps hold presidents and majorities accountable. But party loyalty must have its limits."

The formal impeachment vote in the House of Representatives took place on December 18, 2019. Shortly after 8:30 p.m. EST, both articles of impeachment passed. The votes for the charge of abuse of power were 230 in favor, 197 against, and 1 present: House Democrats all voted in support, except Collin Peterson and Jeff Van Drew, who voted against, and Tulsi Gabbard, who voted "present"; all House Republicans voted against, although Justin Amash, an independent who was previously Republican, voted in support of both articles. The votes for the charge of obstruction of Congress were 229 in favor, 198 against, and 1 present: all Democrats voted in support, except Peterson, Van Drew, and Jared Golden, who voted against; and Gabbard, who again voted "present"; all Republicans voted against.

Days before the impeachment vote, it was leaked that Jeff Van Drew was planning to switch parties from Democratic to Republican. A day after the vote, he officially announced that he was switching parties.

Three representatives pending retirement did not vote: Republican Duncan D. Hunter, who was banned from voting under the House's rules after pleading guilty to illegally using campaign funds; Democrat José E. Serrano, who had a health setback after being diagnosed with Parkinson's disease earlier in the year; and Republican John Shimkus, who was visiting his son in Tanzania.

Immediate response 
A day after Trump's impeachment, the evangelical magazine Christianity Today published an editorial calling for his removal from office, stating that the president "attempted to use his political power to coerce a foreign leader to harass and discredit one of the president's political opponents. That is not only a violation of the Constitution; more importantly, it is profoundly immoral."
On December 21, conservative Bill Kristol and a group calling itself "Republicans for the Rule of Law" released an ad encouraging viewers to call their senators to demand top Trump officials be forced to testify in his impeachment trial.

Trump has questioned the validity of the impeachment, citing Harvard law professor Noah Feldman, who argued that the impeachment has technically not taken place until the articles are handed to the Senate. Jonathan Turley later refuted this argument in an op-ed. Trump tweeted or retweeted over 20 messages criticizing Pelosi's handling of the impeachment during the first week of his holiday vacation to Mar-a-Lago. On Christmas Day, he tweeted:

Attorney George T. Conway III and others have noted that if the relevant witnesses are not allowed to testify, Trump's defenders will be negatively affected by "the very evidence they sought to suppress".

Impasse and final vote
Prior to the House impeachment vote, McConnell and Senate Judiciary Committee chairman Lindsey Graham expressed their intentions not to be impartial jurors, contrary to the oath they must take. McConnell said, "I'm not an impartial juror. This is a political process. There is not anything judicial about it. Impeachment is a political decision." Graham said, "I am trying to give a pretty clear signal I have made up my mind. I'm not trying to pretend to be a fair juror here... I will do everything I can to make [the impeachment trial] die quickly."

On December 15, with the support of all 47 Senate Democrats, Senate Minority Leader Charles Schumer wrote a letter to McConnell calling for Mick Mulvaney, Robert Blair, John Bolton, and Michael Duffey to testify, suggesting that pre-trial proceedings take place on January 6, 2020. Two days later, McConnell rejected the call for witnesses to testify, saying that the Senate's role is simply to act as "judge and jury" and not to aid the impeachment process. He also suggested that witnesses be called during the trial, as had happened after Clinton's impeachment. Schumer said that he "did not hear a single sentence, a single argument as to why the witnesses I suggested should not give testimony", citing bipartisan public support for testimony which could fill in gaps caused by Trump having prevented his staff from testifying in the House investigation. On January 2, 2020, Schumer called newly unredacted emails from Trump administration officials "a devastating blow to Senator McConnell's push to have a trial without the documents and witnesses we've requested". At least four Republican senators needed to vote with Democrats for witnesses to be called.
Republicans have suggested calling Joe and Hunter Biden to testify; the former stated his objection to this, but said he would obey a subpoena. Rudy Giuliani has stated his willingness to testify or even try the impeachment "as a racketeering case", despite being Trump's personal attorney and allegedly attempting to help him politically while searching for evidence against the Bidens in Ukraine. On January 10, 2020, Trump told Laura Ingraham of Fox News that he would likely invoke executive privilege to keep Bolton from testifying "for the sake of the office".

On December 18, 2019, the day of the impeachment, Pelosi declined to comment on when the impeachment resolution would be transmitted to the Senate, stating, "So far we haven't seen anything that looks fair to us." The following day, McConnell met with Schumer briefly to discuss the trial. After the Senate reconvened from its holiday break, Lindsey Graham proposed that he and McConnell "change the rules of the Senate so we could start the trial without [Pelosi], if necessary". On January 7, 2020, McConnell announced he had the caucus backing to pass a blueprint for the trial, which discussed witnesses and evidence after the opening arguments. Pelosi called for the resolution to be published before she could proceed with the next steps, but McConnell asserted that the House had no leverage and that there would be no negotiating over the trial. This prompted several Democratic senators to voice their readiness to have the trial begin. On January 9, Pelosi said she would deliver the articles soon, but continued to cite a need for Republican transparency in the Senate; that same day, McConnell informed members of his caucus that he expected the trial to begin the next week, and Senator Josh Hawley announced that McConnell had signed on as a co-sponsor to his resolution to dismiss articles of impeachment not sent to the Senate within 25 days. On January 10, Pelosi announced she had "asked Judiciary Committee Chairman Jerry Nadler to be prepared to bring to the Floor next week a resolution to appoint managers and transmit articles of impeachment to the Senate".

On January 14, 2020, Pelosi announced the House managers who would prosecute the case in the Senate. On January 15, the House voted on Resolution 798, which appointed the impeachment managers and approved the articles of impeachment to be sent to the Senate. Later that afternoon, Pelosi held a rare public engrossment ceremony, followed by a stately procession of the managers and other House officers across the Capitol building, where the third impeachment of a U.S. president was announced to the senate. Except for the managers, who would conduct the trial, the House's involvement in the impeachment process came to an end.

Trial

Preparation 
While the impeachment inquiry was underway, Senate majority leader Mitch McConnell started planning a possible trial. On October 8, 2019, he led a meeting on the subject, advising his caucus to say that they opposed the House process and as little else as possible. In November, he shot down the idea that the articles of impeachment should be dismissed, stating that "the rules of impeachment are very clear, we'll have to have a trial." On December 12, as the articles were being considered by the House Judiciary Committee, McConnell met with White House counsel Pat Cipollone and Director of Legislative Affairs Eric Ueland. McConnell stated later that day, "Everything I do during this I'm coordinating with the White House counsel. There will be no difference between the president's position and [ours]... I'm going to take my cues from the president's lawyers." McConnell added that the coordination with the White House would also pertain to whether witnesses would be allowed to testify, and told Sean Hannity of Fox News that there was no chance Trump would be convicted, expressing his hope that all Senate Republicans would acquit the president of both charges. Republican senators Lisa Murkowski and Susan Collins criticized McConnell's comments regarding coordinating with the White House. Collins has been critical of Democratic senator Elizabeth Warren for prejudging the trial.

Officers 
The U.S. Constitution stipulates that the Chief Justice of the United States presides over impeachment proceedings. The current chief justice was John Roberts, who was appointed by President George W. Bush in 2005. The House managers, acting as prosecutors for the case, were several Democratic representatives, consisting of Adam Schiff as lead manager, Jerry Nadler, Zoe Lofgren, Hakeem Jeffries, Val Demings, Jason Crow, and Sylvia Garcia. Trump named a defense team led by White House Counsel Pat Cipollone and his private attorney Jay Sekulow, who previously represented Trump in the Russia investigation. They were joined by celebrity law professor Alan Dershowitz, former Independent Counsel Kenneth Starr, former Deputy Independent Counsel Robert Ray, former Florida Attorney General Pam Bondi, and former Federal Prosecutor Jane Raskin

Process and schedule 
Article I, Section 3, Clause 6 of the U.S. Constitution states that "[t]he Senate shall have the sole Power to try all Impeachments." Per the Senate's impeachment rules adopted in 1986, the submission of the articles to the Senate initiated the trial. The articles were formally delivered on January 15, 2020, and were presented the following day.

At the end of the session on January 21, the Senate voted along party lines to pass McConnell's proposed trial rules and reject 11 amendments proposed by Democrats. McConnell stated that he wanted to follow the rules laid down during the Clinton trial in 1999, which had the morning reserved for Senate business and the afternoon hours reserved for the trial, but his resolution increased the hours spent per day on opening arguments from six to eight hours. The resolution also included provisions for a vote on whether to subpoena witnesses or documents after opening arguments.

The prosecution's opening arguments and presentation of evidence took place between January 22 and 24, 2020. On the first day, Schumer called the previous evening "a dark night for the Senate", when the White House, in response to a Freedom of Information Act lawsuit, released new evidence including a string of heavily redacted emails revealing details about how the Office of Management and Budget froze aid to Ukraine.

Trump's defense presentation began on January 25. The primary arguments were a lack of direct evidence of wrongdoing and that Democrats were attempting to use the impeachment to steal the 2020 election. Professor Alan Dershowitz argued that while a president can be impeached for committing a criminal act, irrespective of motive, the idea of a 'quid pro quo' being a basis for removal from office requires that the 'quo' be something illegal, and that simply having mixed motives for requesting a legal act (an investigation into alleged corruption) would not be sufficient grounds for impeachment. He observed that all politicians act with an eye and motive toward re-election and that such motive neither makes illegal acts lawful nor unlawful act legal. This position was criticized by Democratic political consultant and commentator Paul Begala in an editorial that did not address the legality/illegality aspect of the analysis.

On January 31, after a planned debate session, the Senate voted against allowing subpoenas to call witnesses, including former national security advisor John Bolton (who wrote in his forthcoming book mentioning Ukraine aid freezing) or documents with a 51–49 vote. 51 Republican senators voted against calling witnesses, while 45 Democratic senators, two independents who typically voted Democratic, and two Republicans (Mitt Romney and Susan Collins) voted for witnesses.

Acquittal
Under the U.S. Constitution, two-thirds of the Senate is required to convict the president. The possible penalties are the removal from office and disqualification from holding office in the future. On February 5, 2020, the Senate acquitted Trump on both counts. The votes were 52–48 to acquit on the first count and 53–47 to acquit on the second count. The votes were sharply divided along party lines. Mitt Romney became the first senator in history from an impeached president's party to vote to convict, voting "guilty" on the first count.

Public opinion 
Before the trial, in mid January 2020, Americans were sharply divided on whether Trump should be removed from office, with Democrats largely supporting removal, Republicans largely opposing, and independents divided. A USA Today/Suffolk University poll conducted between December 10 and 14, 2019, found that 45% of respondents supported the impeachment and removal of Trump from office, while 51% opposed it. A CNN poll conducted from December 12 to 15 also found 45% supported impeachment and removal, compared to 47% who opposed the idea. A Gallup poll released on the day of Trump's impeachment found that the president's approval rating increased by six points during the impeachment process, while support for the impeachment fell. Another CNN poll conducted between January 16 and 19, 2020, found that 51% supported Trump's removal from office, compared to 45% who opposed it. An NBC/Wall Street Journal poll released on January 2, 2020, showed 46% favored removal from office and 49% opposed, with the in favor/opposed being almost exclusively along party lines.

Aftermath 

Two days after the Senate acquitted him in the impeachment trial, Trump fired two witnesses who testified in the impeachment inquiry about his conduct. On February 7, Gordon Sondland's ambassadorship was terminated, and Lieutenant Colonel Alexander Vindman was escorted from the White House after a dismissal from his job on the National Security Council. At the same time, Vindman's twin brother Yevgeny, likewise an Army lieutenant colonel on the National Security Council, was also dismissed. Shortly before the firings, Trump said he was "not happy" with Alexander Vindman; after the firings, Trump said he "didn't know" Alexander Vindman but he was "very insubordinate". Alexander Vindman's lawyer responded that his client "was asked to leave for telling the truth. His honor, his commitment to right, frightened the powerful." Sondland reacted by stating that he was "grateful to President Trump for the opportunity to serve".

In April 2020, Trump fired Michael K. Atkinson, the inspector general of the intelligence community. Trump further complained that Atkinson "never even came in to see me. How can you [forward the complaint] without seeing the person?"; he also concluded that Atkinson was "not a big Trump fan". Atkinson responded that he believed Trump had fired him for "having faithfully discharged my legal obligations as an independent and impartial inspector general, and from my commitment to continue to do so".

Biden would be elected President of the United States that November. The subsequent storming of the U.S. Capitol would lead to Trump's unprecedented second impeachment.

See also
 List of federal political scandals in the United States

Notes

References

External links 

 House impeaches President Trump – live-stream archive via C-SPAN
 How each member of the House voted on impeachment — via CNN
 
 Real Clear Politics polling history: Trump Impeachment and Removal From Office: Support/Oppose
 

 
Political corruption investigations in the United States
Articles containing video clips